By-elections to fifteen state assembly constituencies were held in Karnataka on 5 December 2019, and results were announced on 9 December. BJP, the ruling party, needed to win 6 out of the 15 seats to maintain its majority. It won 12 out of 15 seats. Congress won two, JD(S) failed to open its account, and one seat was won by a rebel BJP leader who contested as an independent.

Election schedule

Scheduled
By-elections to fifteen state assembly constituencies were originally to be held on 21 October 2019 together with Haryana and Maharashtra Assembly elections. The counting of votes was to be on 24 October 2019.

Rescheduled
The Election Commission on 27 September rescheduled the by-elections to 15 Karnataka assembly constituencies to 5 December and will declare the results no later than 11 December.

Surveys and polls

Seat projections

Results

Results by party

Results by constituency

Gains by BJP
The bypolls were necessitated because 15 MLAs, from Congress and Janata Dal (S), resigned to bring down Kumaraswamy's coalition government. BJP won 12 out of 15 seats. But 3 seats escaped its grasp. Roshan Beg from Shivajinagar had resigned. But BJP did not allow Roshan Baig to join them, and he did not contest the bypoll. Congress retained the seat. From Hoskote, MTB Nagaraj resigned his seat and joined BJP who nominated him from his former seat. But a BJP rebel challenged him, and the rebel won. From Hunsur (Hunasuru), Adagur Vishwanath had won on JD(S) ticket, defeating Manjunath of Congress. He resigned, and contested as BJP candidate this time. But this time Manjunath managed to win the seat for Congress.

See also 
 Elections in Karnataka
 Government of Karnataka
 Karnataka Legislative Assembly

References

State Assembly elections in Karnataka
2010s in Karnataka
2019 State Assembly elections in India
2019